Tortyra rhodoclaena is a moth of the family Choreutidae. It is known from French Guiana.

References

Tortyra
Moths described in 1930